Zu is an Italian instrumental band from Rome. While their line-up of baritone sax, bass guitar and drums is typical of a jazz band, their hard-driving sound is indebted to punk rock and according to AllMusic "defies easy categorization". Zu have collaborated with a wide variety of musicians and been described as "masters at adapting to their guests' musical backgrounds".

History
Hailing from Ostia (a town near Rome), Zu are an atypical trio consisting of drums, bass, baritone saxophone and electronics. Formed in Rome in 1997, they began as composers and performers for theater productions. The band is composed of three members: Luca Mai on baritone saxophone, Massimo Pupillo on bass and Jacopo Battaglia on drums. 

Zu have released fourteen albums, including two live albums and two splits. They have played at festivals in Europe, America, Asia and Africa. In 2006, the band toured with the super group Fantômas Melvins Big Band.

The members are also active in the Italian folk-jazz group Ardecore.

Style 

Zu's music is instrumental and features virtuosic drumming, powerful bass and distorted saxophone. Many of the band's albums are billed as collaborations with a guest musician (such as Mike Patton, Buzz Osborne, Mats Gustafsson and Nobukazu Takemura). Often, a collaborator will join them at live performances as well. Members of the band also collaborate with other musical projects, many of which exist only as live performances.

Reception
John Zorn described the band as creating "a powerful and expressive music that totally blows away what most bands do these days".

In 2009, Carboniferous was voted Album of the Year in Rock-A-Rolla magazine's Best of 2009 poll.

Personnel 

Luca T. Mai – baritone saxophone
Jacopo Battaglia – drums
Massimo Pupillo – bass
Stefano Pilia – guitar

Ex-members 
Gabe Serbian – drums
Tomas Järmyr – drums

Major collaborators 
Eugene Chadbourne – guitar on The Zu Side of the Chadbourne and Motorhellington
Jeb Bishop – trombone on Igneo
Mats Gustafsson – saxophones on How to Raise an Ox
Xabier Iriondo – on Zu / Iceburn
Fred Lonberg-Holm – cello on The Way of the Animal Powers
Nobukazu Takemura – electronics on Identification with the Enemy – A Key to the Underworld
Spaceways inc. – on Radiale
Mike Patton – vocals on some live dates and Carboniferous
Ken Vandermark – saxophones on Igneo and Radiale
Buzz Osborne – on Carboniferous
Balázs Pándi – drums on 2011 tour
Eugene Robinson – vocals on The Left Hand Path
David Tibet – vocals on Mirror Emperor
Damo Suzuki – vocals on some live dates
Okapi – electronics on Zu / Dalek / Okapi and on some live dates

Discography 
 1999: Bromio
 2000: The Zu Side of the Chadbourne
 2001: Motorhellington
 2002: Igneo
 2003: Live in Helsinki
 2004: Radiale
 2004: Eccentrics, Issue #1 Hinterlandt / Zu / Can Can Heads
 2005: The Way of the Animal Powers
 2005: How to Raise an Ox
 2005: Zu/Dälek feat Økapi
 2006: Rai Sanawachi Koe Wo Hassu
 2006: Zu / Iceburn – PhonoMetak 10" Series No. 1
 2007: Identification with the Enemy: A Key to the Underworld
 2008: Il Teatro degli Orrori/Zu
 2008: Zu/Xabier Iriondo/Damo Suzuki – PhonoMetak 10" Series No. 4
 2009: Carboniferous
 2014: Goodnight Civilization EP
 2014: Zu & Eugene Robinson – The Left Hand Path
 2015: Cortar Todo
 2017: Jhator
 2018: ZU93 Mirror Emperor
 2019: Terminalia Amazonia

Singles and music videos 
 "Carbon" (2009)
 "Soulympics" (2009)
 "Goodnight, Civilization" (2014)
 "Cortar Todo" (2015)

References

External links

Italian progressive rock groups
Free improvisation ensembles
Avant-garde metal musical groups
Musical groups established in 1999
Musical groups from Rome
Ipecac Recordings artists
1999 establishments in Italy